Ulva bifrons is a species of blackish-green coloured seaweed in the family Ulvaceae that can be found in Sezimbra, Portugal, in France and Spain, and Balearic islands.

References

Ulvaceae
Plants described in 1967
Flora of Europe